Vijay Kumar Dada is an Indian ophthalmologist and a consultant at the Sir Ganga Ram Hospital, New Delhi. An alumnus and a former chief of the Dr. R. P. Centre for Ophthalmic Sciences of the All India Institute of Medical Sciences, he has written several articles on eye diseases such as cataract and glaucoma. Dada, an elected fellow of the National Academy of Medical Sciences, was honored by the Government of India, in 2002, with the fourth highest Indian civilian award of Padma Shri.

See also

 Cataract
 Glaucoma

References

External links
 
 

Recipients of the Padma Shri in medicine
Living people
Indian ophthalmologists
All India Institute of Medical Sciences, New Delhi alumni
Academic staff of the All India Institute of Medical Sciences, New Delhi
Indian medical writers
Fellows of the National Academy of Medical Sciences
20th-century Indian medical doctors
Year of birth missing (living people)
20th-century surgeons